"Flow Natural" is a song by Puerto Rican reggaeton singer Tito El Bambino, Dominican Republic singer Deevani (credited as Ines), and Jamaican reggae recording artist Beenie Man. It was released in 2006 as the second single from Tito El Bambino's debut solo album Top of the Line. The song was written by Beenie Man, Tito El Bambino, and Francisco Saldaña; it was produced by Tainy, Luny Tunes, and Nales. Its chorus samples "Chhadh Gayi Chhadh Gayi", a song from the 2002 Indian film Chor Machaaye Shor.

In the U.S., the song peaked at no. 16 on the Hot Latin Songs chart in 2006.

Chart performance
The song entered the Billboard Hot Latin Songs chart at no. 40 on August 5, 2006. "Flow Natural" peaked on that chart on September 30 at no. 1.

Charts

References

External links
 "Flow Natural" lyrics on Musixmatch

2006 songs
2006 singles
Tito El Bambino songs
Beenie Man songs
Song recordings produced by Luny Tunes
Songs written by Francisco Saldaña
Songs written by Tito El Bambino